, born on December 22, 1961, is a Japanese music composer, record producer, keyboardist and guitarist. He is also the director of music production company P.M CREATORS.

Career outline
 Yabuki was J-Pop singer Masami Okui's executive producer from 1995 to 2001. In 2008 he became J-Pop singer and voice actress Nana Mizuki's executive producer.
 He formed a collaboration named Vink with Tsutomu Oohira and Akimitsu Honma, the executive producer of Porno Graffitti. Vink's music compositions include the anime television series All Purpose Cultural Cat Girl Nuku Nuku and Slayers. Additionally, Vink was responsible for the arrangement of several Megumi Hayashibara songs.

Notes and references

External links

1961 births
Japanese composers
Japanese male composers
Japanese record producers
Living people